April, and a Flower (styled as April, and a flower) is the debut extended play by South Korean singer Chen. It was released on April 1, 2019 by SM Entertainment and distributed by Dreamus. The extended play features six songs including the hit lead single "Beautiful Goodbye". The album is available in three versions: April, Flower, and a standard Kihno version of the album.

Background and release 
On March 8, it was reported that Chen would release his first solo album in April. On March 19, the EP's title April, and a Flower, release date and art cover were revealed. The pre-order of the three versions of the EP started on the same day. On March 21, a detailed teaser photo of the EP schedule was released. On March 22, the track list and the album details were released.

On March 25, three image teasers of the singer were released. On March 26, additional three image teasers were released. On March 27, highlight medley of the EP was released. On March 29, three image teasers of the singer were released. On the same day, the first teaser of "Beautiful Goodbye" music video was released. On March 30, two additional teaser photos were released.

On April 1, the official music video of "Beautiful Goodbye" and the EP were released. On April 5, a vertical video of "Beautiful Goodbye" was released. On April 8, a visual video of "Flower" was released. On April 19, a handwritten video of "Beautiful Goodbye" was released, where fans of Chen participated in writing the lyrics of the song on papers, and a video collage was made of it.

Promotion 

On April 1, Chen held a showcase where he talked about the process of making the EP and held a listening session of it, the singer also performed the lead single "Beautiful Goodbye" for the first time. On the same day he held a busking event titled "Chen's April Busking" at Coex Artium Mall where he discussed about each track of the EP with the fans, and performed "Sorry Not Sorry" and "Beautiful Goodbye". Chen started promoting on Korean music programs for one week starting from April 5, 2019 and resulted in achieving first place on two music programs. On April 6, The singer held a fansign in Sinchon, and on April 20, in Busan and Daegu.

Track listing

Charts

Weekly charts

Year-end charts

Sales

Accolades

Release history

References

2019 debut EPs
SM Entertainment albums
Korean-language EPs
IRiver EPs